Carlos Pellegrini is a town in the center-west of Santa Fe Province, Argentina.

According to the 2001 census, it has 5,062 inhabitants: 2,555 women and 2,507 men. It has had a growth of 158 (5.41%) over the 1991 census.

The area's economy is mainly farming and cattle.

There are two elementary schools, one middle school and two rural schools.

The town has two radio stations (FM) and one TV Station.

Location

Altitude: 101 m (304 ft)
Latitude: 32°03′S
Longitude: 061°48′W

Climate and topography

The topography of the area is slightly undulated, with uniform characteristics and slight slopes, which help with communications. The soil is very apt for agriculture. The area is located in an elevated terrain, at about 101 m (304 ft), which permits the natural draining of waters on all four points of the compass. As a result, flooding is rare.

Climate is temperate. It has a humid period from March to July. The last two months are not humid because of precipitation, but for the accumulated water in the soil. August would be the only dry month if not for the aforementioned. No month of the year presents an excess of water. January and February have a deficiency of 60 mm (2.3 in) together. During the rest of the year there is no water deficit because evaporation is amply covered with rain and soil accumulation.

Twin cities 
  San Secondo di Pinerolo, Italy

External links

 Official site

Populated places in Santa Fe Province
Cities in Argentina
Argentina
Santa Fe Province